Physalopteridae is a family of spirurian nematodes, which belongs to the superfamily Physalopteroidea. Like all nematodes, they have neither a circulatory nor a respiratory system.

The Physalopteridae include species which are parasitic in various vertebrates.

Systematics
The family includes: 
 Subfamily Physalopterinae Railliet, 1893
 Genus Physaloptera Rudolphi, 1819
 Genus Abbreviata Travassos, 1920
 Subfamily Proleptinae Schulz, 1927
 Genus Rasheedia Moravec & Justine, 2018
 Genus Heliconema Travassos, 1919
 Genus Paraleptus Wu, 1927
 Genus Proleptus Dujardin, 1845

References 

Spirurida
Nematode families